Considered Dead is the debut full-length studio album by Canadian death metal band Gorguts. It was released on October 8, 1991, by Roadrunner Records, whom the band signed with after the release of their 1991 demo ...And Then Comes Lividity. The album features guest vocals by Chris Barnes of Cannibal Corpse on three tracks, as well as a guest guitar solo by James Murphy, who has played with Death, Obituary, and Testament. The following year, the band took part in the "Blood, Guts and Gore" U.S. tour along with Cannibal Corpse and Atheist.

Considered Dead was later remastered, reissued and paired with its successor, The Erosion of Sanity, as part of Roadrunner's Two from the Vault series, in 2004. It was reissued alone in 2006 with two demo tracks.

Track listing

Personnel

Gorguts
 Luc Lemay – vocals, guitar, cover concept, logo, production
 Sylvain Marcoux – guitar, production
 Eric Giguere – bass, production
 Stephane Provencher – drums, production

Additional personnel
 James Murphy – guest solo (10)
 Chris Barnes – guest vocals (5, 6, 9)

Technical personnel
 Scott Burns – production, engineering, mixing
 Michael Sarsfield – mastering
 Dan Seagrave – cover illustration
 Ivan-Pierre Dubois – photo
 Patricia Mooned – art direction
 Matt Vickerstaff – 2016 reissue layout

References

Gorguts albums
1991 debut albums
Roadrunner Records albums
Albums produced by Scott Burns (record producer)
Albums with cover art by Dan Seagrave